Boustedt is a Swedish surname. Notable people with the surname include:

 Bo Boustedt (1868–1939), Swedish Army lieutenant general
 Christer Boustedt (1939–1986), Swedish musician and actor
 Tommy Boustedt (born 1959), Swedish hockey coach

Swedish-language surnames